Oswestry Rural is a civil parish in Shropshire, England.  It contains 94 listed buildings that are recorded in the National Heritage List for England.  Of these, three are at Grade II*, the middle of the three grades, and the others are at Grade II, the lowest grade.  The parish is to the southwest, south and southeast of the town of Oswestry.  It contains numerous villages and smaller settlements, including Rhydycroesau, Trefonen, Morda, Maesbury, and Treflach, and is otherwise completely rural.  Most of the listed buildings are farmhouses, farm buildings, houses and cottages, the earliest of which are timber framed, or which have a timber-framed core.  In the parish are three country houses that are listed, together with associated structures in the grounds.  The Montgomery Canal passes through the parish and the listed buildings associated with this are three bridges and a crane.  The other listed buildings include a holy well, road bridges, a public house, two former mills, two milestones, a former chapel, and three pumps with basins.
 

Key

Buildings

References

Citations

Sources

Lists of buildings and structures in Shropshire